Hell's Kitchen is a British cookery reality show, aired on ITV, which featured prospective chefs competing with each other for a final prize. Four series aired between 2004 and 2009, three presented by Angus Deayton and the fourth and final series presented by Claudia Winkleman.

Cast

Series overview

Series 1 (2004)

Series 1 of Hell's Kitchen in the UK was broadcast from 23 May to 6 June 2004, airing live nightly for two weeks.

The premise was head chef Gordon Ramsay teaching ten celebrities how to cook. The celebrities were placed in a specially constructed London restaurant-kitchen with the task of catering for a clientele of famous people. Eliminations were determined by a series of public votes (in the style of Big Brother). One notorious moment saw Amanda Barrie repeatedly trying to strike Ramsay when she became irate.

Jennifer Ellison was declared the winner. A follow-up programme was made afterwards called Hell's Kitchen: School Reunion, which saw Ellison and the show runner-up, James Dreyfus, team up to organise a healthy dinner service for the children at Ramsay's former school, Stratford Upon Avon High School.

The celebrities who took part were:

Series 2 (2005)
Series 2 of Hell's Kitchen in the UK was broadcast from 18 April – 2 May 2005.

The format was overhauled as the show was turned into a competition between two kitchens run by "celebrity chefs" Gary Rhodes and Jean-Christophe Novelli. The second series featured ten members of the public competing for a prize of £250,000, with which the winner could start his or her own restaurant. They were split into two teams of six, one red (tutored by Gary Rhodes) and the other blue (led by Jean-Christophe Novelli). A new and much larger restaurant was built to accommodate the fact that there were now two kitchens.

The only things that remained the same in the second series were the music, by composer Daniel Pemberton, and the presenter, who was still Angus Deayton. Elimination was still down to voting.

The series was won by Terry Miller.

The contestants who took part were:
Blue Team (Head chef Jean-Christophe Novelli)
Henry Filloux-Bennett
Aby King
Rory O'Donnell
Gary Tomlin
Kellie Cresswell
Stien Smart
Red Team (Head chef Gary Rhodes)
Terry Miller
Simon Gross
Aaron Siwoku
Tom Paisley
Caroline Gravy
Sam Raplin

Series 3 (2007)
Series 3 was due to begin in mid-2006, with Jean-Christophe Novelli as the sole head chef; however, ITV made the decision to take a break from producing Hell's Kitchen. The network then announced in February 2007 that it had commissioned a new series of the show, to begin in late 2007.

The new series began on 3 September 2007 at 9:00 pm. Michelin starred Marco Pierre White was the new head chef. White had two sous chefs, Matthew and Timothy. The series reverted to the original format of having celebrities as contestants.

The series ended on 17 September 2007, with Barry McGuigan crowned winner.

The contestants who took part were:

Series 4 (2009)

Series 4 began on 13 April 2009. Marco Pierre White returns as Head Chef/teacher. Claudia Winkleman took over as host, replacing Angus Deayton. Nick Munier returned as Maitre d', as did Sous Chefs Matthew and Timothy. This series there was one kitchen with grey and dark red tiles. The first four sackings were Marco's responsibility, while the other four sackings were down to a public vote (the person with the lowest number of votes left Hell's Kitchen).

Linda Evans won from public voting on 27 April 2009.

The celebrities who took part were:

International versions
Most countries adapt to the American version, airing pre recorded weekly instead of airing live daily, no presenter and just a voiceover, a challenge with the winner earning a reward and the loser doing a punishment, the customers being mostly from the public instead of celebrities with their loved ones and eliminations made by the head chef and not through viewer voting. The Australian, German and Spanish versions were modeled after the British series, where the contestants are celebrities with no professional culinary backgrounds, many may also be complete novices in cooking in general.

 Franchise with a currently airing season
 Franchise no longer in production

References

External links

2000s British cooking television series
2004 British television series debuts
2009 British television series endings
English-language television shows
UK
ITV reality television shows
Television series by ITV Studios
Television shows produced by Granada Television
Cooking competitions in the United Kingdom